Maramar Deuta is a children's novel written in Assamese by renowned Assamese author and film director Dr. Bhabendra Nath Saikia.  It is about the bond between a child and his father. It was first published serially in several episodes in children's magazine Xophura, also then edited by Dr. Bhabendra Nath Saikia.  Although the author said that the novel was especially meant for teenagers, it is popular among all age groups.

The novel was translated into English by Ashok Bhagawati and published by National Book Trust of New Delhi in 1998. The name of the English version is Dear Father.

References

Indian children's novels
Assamese-language books
Novels first published in serial form
Assamese novels
1998 novels
1998 children's books
Works originally published in children's magazines
1998 Indian novels